Thomas Lowry Young (December 14, 1832July 20, 1888) was an American politician from the U.S. state of Ohio. Young, a Republican, served as the 33rd governor of Ohio from March 2, 1877, to January 14, 1878.

Early life
Young was born in Killyleagh, County Down, in Ulster, a northern province of Ireland. At that time, all of Ireland was part of the United Kingdom of Great Britain and Ireland. While living in Ireland, his father was a gardener for The 2nd Baron Dufferin and Claneboye. He immigrated with his parents to the United States as a child and spent his childhood in New York.

Military career
Young enlisted in the U.S. Army in 1848, originally joining as a musician. He advanced through the ranks of the artillery to become a First Sergeant in the 3rd U.S. Artillery, serving under Brevet Major John F. Reynolds.  After his service ended in January 1858, Young moved to Pennsylvania, then to Cincinnati a year later, where he served as the Assistant Superintendent for the House of Refuge Reform School for Youth.

In March 1861 Young, believing a civil war to be imminent, wrote to General Winfield Scott volunteering his services. He officially joined the American Civil War effort a month later. Between August and December, he served under John C. Frémont as a captain while stationed in Missouri. The unit disbanded at the beginning of 1862, and Young left the service. He worked for a Democratic Party newspaper in Sidney, Ohio, afterwards, and spoke out against the Lincoln Administration, believing them to be too soft in the war effort thus far. Young re-enlisted and received a commission as major in the 118th Ohio Infantry in September 1862, where he remained for the duration of his service. He was promoted to the rank of lieutenant colonel in February 1863 and the rank of colonel in April 1864. At the Battle of Resaca in May, Young led a charge against the enemy that was quickly defeated; the charge caused him to lose 116 of his 270 men in the span of a few minutes. He contracted an illness during the Atlanta Campaign, and resigned from the Army in September. President Abraham Lincoln brevetted him Brigadier-General of volunteers for his service on March 13, 1865.

Political career
After resigning, Young returned to Cincinnati and graduated from the Cincinnati Law School in 1865. Shortly afterward, he began his political career with an appointment as Assistant City Auditor, a position he held for the rest of the year. He was elected to the Ohio House of Representatives afterward, and served a single two-year term from 1866 to 1868. Young became Hamilton County Recorder in October 1867, and held the position until President Andrew Johnson named him Internal Revenue Supervisor of Southern Ohio in late 1868, a position he held through 1869. After resigning from that position, Young worked in real estate until 1871 when he was elected to the Ohio State Senate. At that point he was considered highly regarded in the Republican Party, and when elected to the State Senate, he had more votes than most other Republicans on the statewide ballot.

Young was elected the 12th lieutenant governor of Ohio in 1875, defeating Samuel Cary, taking office in 1876. He then filled out the term of Rutherford B. Hayes when the latter was elected to the presidency, serving from 1877 to 1878.

Later life
Young was then elected to the United States House of Representatives in 1878 and served two terms before losing a battle for renomination in 1882. He died in 1888 while holding a position on the Cincinnati Board of Public Affairs. Young was buried in Spring Grove Cemetery in Cincinnati.

See also

List of American Civil War generals
List of U.S. state governors born outside the United States

Notes

References

External links
 

1832 births
1888 deaths
People from County Down
Republican Party governors of Ohio
Lieutenant Governors of Ohio
Republican Party Ohio state senators
Republican Party members of the Ohio House of Representatives
Ohio lawyers
Politicians from Cincinnati
Union Army generals
University of Cincinnati College of Law alumni
People from Killyleagh
People of Ohio in the American Civil War
Irish emigrants to the United States (before 1923)
Burials at Spring Grove Cemetery
Irish-American culture in Ohio
19th-century American politicians
19th-century American lawyers
Republican Party members of the United States House of Representatives from Ohio